"The Yellow Rose of Texas" is a traditional American folk song dating back to at least the 1850s. Members of the Western Writers of America chose it as one of the Top 100 Western songs of all time. Several versions of the song have been recorded, including by Elvis Presley, Willie Nelson and Mitch Miller.

Origin
The earliest known version is found in Christy's Plantation Melodies. No. 2, a songbook published under the authority of Edwin Pearce Christy in Philadelphia in 1853. Christy was the founder of the blackface minstrel show known as the Christy's Minstrels. Like most minstrel songs, the lyrics are written in a cross between a parody of a generic creole dialect historically attributed to African-Americans and standard American English. The song is written in the first person from the perspective of an African-American singer who refers to himself as a "darkey," longing to return to "a yellow girl" (that is, a light-skinned, or bi-racial woman born of African/African-American and European-American progenitors).

The soundtrack to the TV miniseries James A. Michener's Texas dates a version of the song to June 2, 1933, and co-credits both the authorship and performance to Gene Autry and Jimmy Long.  Don George reworked the original version of the song, which Mitch Miller made into a popular recording in 1955 that knocked Bill Haley & His Comets' "Rock Around The Clock" from the top of the Best Sellers chart in the U.S.  Miller's version was featured in the 1956 motion picture Giant, and reached #1 on the U.S. pop chart the same week Giant star James Dean died.  Stan Freberg had a simultaneous hit of a parody version in which the bandleader warred with the snare drummer, Alvin Stoller, who also featured prominently in Miller's arrangement. Billboard ranked Miller's version as the No. 3 song of 1955.

Lyrics
Earliest known version, from Christy's Plantation Melodies. No. 2:

Civil War use of the song
This song became popular among Confederate soldiers in the Texas Brigade during the American Civil War; upon taking command of the Army of Tennessee in July 1864, General John Bell Hood introduced it as a marching song. The final verse and chorus were slightly altered by the remains of Hood's force after their crushing defeat at the Battle of Nashville that December:

(Last verse)

The modified lyrics reference famous Confederate military commanders Joseph Johnston, P.G.T. Beauregard, and Robert E. Lee. Texan veterans sang it openly to mock Hood's mishandling of their Nashville campaign.

In this version of the chorus, "soldier" replaced "darkey." The same substitution is made throughout the song.

The song was very popular with not only Texan troops but other infantry units in the west such as Louisiana and Arkansas.

Gene Autry and Jimmy Long version
Gene Autry first recorded this song on January 27, 1933, at Victor Studios, without supporting musicians. On March 1, he and Jimmy Long recorded the better-known version for American Record Corporation (ARC). This was released in June 1933 on Melotone, Perfect and several other dime store labels distributed by ARC. His version started with "There's a yellow rose in Texas, I'm going back to see,
no other fellow knows her, nobody else but me." On March 10, Autry filed a copyright not for lyrics, but for his arrangement and melody. Whether the copyright was good is unknown, Gene knew all the tricks of the trade, and he learned how to squeeze every dime  out of his creative efforts. He made a small fortune from songwriting and publishing over the years (600 songs), and in 1961 he bought a major league baseball team.

Popular hit
In September 1955, for six weeks, Mitch Miller had a Billboard number one hit with "The Yellow Rose of Texas", and 13 months later, Miller's hit version was used for a key scene in the 1956 Texas-based film Giant. Miller's lyrics used "rosebud" and no words - except the term "yellow" - to indicate either Rose or the singer was a person of color. The 1955 song became a gold record. The song achieved the #2 position in the UK and the #1 position in Australia.

In 1955 Stan Freberg issued a parody version of the song which sees him battle against an over-enthusiastic snare drummer.

The Yellow Rose

In 1984, country music artists Johnny Lee and Lane Brody recorded a song titled "The Yellow Rose," which retained the original melody of "The Yellow Rose of Texas" but with new lyrics, for the title theme to a TV series also titled The Yellow Rose. It was a number one country hit that year.

Other versions
 Dacosta Woltz's Southern Broadcasters, Gennet - 6143 (1927)
 Dario Moreno
 Gene Autry & Jimmy Long - recorded for Melotone Records on March 1, 1933, catalog No. 12700
 Roy Rogers (1942)
 Bing Crosby recorded the song in 1955 for use on his radio show and it was subsequently included in the CD So Rare: Treasures from the Crosby Archive (2010) 
 Ronnie Hilton - this reached the No. 15 spot in the UK charts in 1955.
 Michael Holliday - a single release in 1955.
 Mantovani (1959)
 Pat Boone (1961)
 Hoyt Axton (1991) on "Songs of the Civil War" CD (Columbia)
 Kidsongs (1997)
 Waldemar Matuška

See also

 Yellow Rose of Texas Award
 High yellow
 Emily D. West
 The Yellow Rose

References

External links

The Yellow Rose of Texas sheet music at the International Music Score Library Project
MP3 file at Yellow Rose of Texas from amaranthpublishing.com
MIDI file  and lyrics  from Songs of Texas at Lone Star Junction: A Texas and Texas History Resource
 
 

1858 songs
1933 singles
1955 singles
American folk songs
Western music (North America)
Number-one singles in Australia
Number-one singles in the United States
Texas culture
Songs about Texas
John Bell Hood
Ernest Tubb songs
Elvis Presley songs
Songs of the American Civil War
Songwriter unknown
Year of song unknown